Willis William Ritter (January 24, 1899 – March 4, 1978) was a United States district judge of the United States District Court for the District of Utah.

Education and career

Ritter was born in Salt Lake City, Utah, and grew up in Midway, Utah and Park City, Utah. He received an Artium Baccalaureus degree from the University of Utah, and a Bachelor of Laws from the University of Chicago Law School in 1924. He was in private practice in Chicago, Illinois, and Washington, D.C. from 1924 to 1926. He was a professor of law at the University of Utah from 1926 to 1950, and in private practice in Salt Lake City from 1935 to 1949, also receiving a Doctor of Juridical Science from Harvard Law School in 1940.

Federal judicial service

On October 21, 1949, Ritter received a recess appointment from President Harry S. Truman to a seat on the United States District Court for the District of Utah vacated by Judge Tillman Davis Johnson. He was formally nominated on January 5, 1950, and opposed during the confirmation process by United States Senator from Utah Arthur Vivian Watkins. Ritter was confirmed by the United States Senate on June 29, 1950, and received his commission on July 7, 1950. He served as Chief Judge from 1954 until his death on March 4, 1978, in Salt Lake City.

References

Sources

Further reading
Cowley, Patricia F. and Parker M. Nielson. Thunder Over Zion:The Life of Chief Judge Willis W. Ritter. 2007. 

1899 births
1978 deaths
University of Utah alumni
University of Utah faculty
University of Chicago Law School alumni
Harvard Law School alumni
Judges of the United States District Court for the District of Utah
United States district court judges appointed by Harry S. Truman
20th-century American judges